Adolphe Reymond (4 September 1896 – 7 March 1976) was a Swiss association football player who competed in the 1924 Summer Olympics. He was a member of the Swiss team, which won the silver medal in the football tournament.

References

External links

profile

1896 births
1976 deaths
Swiss men's footballers
Footballers at the 1924 Summer Olympics
Olympic footballers of Switzerland
Olympic silver medalists for Switzerland
Switzerland international footballers
Olympic medalists in football
Medalists at the 1924 Summer Olympics
Association football defenders
Servette FC players